Ahmed Saeed Ahmed Awad Alla (born 1 January 1989) is a Sudanese professional footballer who plays as a forward for Al-Ahly Merowe and the Sudan national football team.

References

1989 births
Living people
Sudanese footballers
Sudan international footballers
Association football forwards
Al Ahli Club (Merowe) players
Al Ahli SC (Khartoum) players